Fikes is a surname. Notable people with the surname include:

Bettie Mae Fikes (born 1948), American singer and activist
Deborah Fikes, American evangelical leader
Richard Fikes (born 1942), American computer scientist

See also
Fike

Americanized surnames